The Italian Monarchist Union (UMI) is an Italian political movement, which has not contested any election since 1946.  Its chief aim is to restore monarchy in Italy. The UMI supports Prince Aimone, Duke of Apulia as King of Italy.

Notes 

1944 establishments in Italy
Monarchism in Italy